Errico is a name. Notable people with the name include:

Given name
Errico Malatesta (1853–1932), Italian anarchist 
Errico Petrella (1813–1877), Italian composer
Erricos
Erricos Andreou, Greek screenwriter and film director

Surname
Andrea Errico (born 1999), Italian footballer
Con Errico (1921–1993), American jockey
Daniel Errico, American children's writer
Danilo Errico (born 1953), Italian military officer
Gaetano Errico (1791–1860), Italian priest
Greg Errico (born 1948), American drummer and record producer
Jan Errico, American drummer
Melissa Errico (born 1970), American singer, writer, and actress
Mike Errico, American singer-songwriter and music producer
D'Errico
Alessandro D'Errico (born 1950), Italian prelate
Andrea D'Errico (born 1992), Italian footballer
Camilla d'Errico (born 1980), Canadian artist and illustrator
Corrado D'Errico (1902–1941), Italian screenwriter and film director
David D'Errico (born 1952), American soccer player
Donna D'Errico (born 1968), American actress and model
Francesco d'Errico (born 1957), Italian archaeologist